Garnet Gilman (born 29 September 1964) is a Trinidadian cricketer. He played in one first-class and two List A matches for Trinidad and Tobago from 1985 to 1988.

See also
 List of Trinidadian representative cricketers

References

External links
 

1964 births
Living people
Trinidad and Tobago cricketers